The Battle of Beth Horon may refer to:

Battle of Beth Horon (166 BC), between Jewish forces led by Judas Maccabaeus and a Seleucid Empire force in the Maccabean Revolt
Battle of Beth Horon (66), between the Roman army and Jewish rebels in the First Jewish-Roman War